Carl Robrecht (25 June 188822 September 1961) was a German musician, conductor and composer, specializing in light music, foxtrots and other dances throughout the 1920s and 1930s. Carl Robrecht also used the pseudonyms "Karl Robrecht" and "Robert Brecht" for some works.

Recorded works
Some of Carl Robrecht's works are recorded on early LP's, including:

 Samum, a symphonic foxtrot (1935)
 Fata Morgana
 Niagara
 Spitzentanz
 Kinderlieder-Potpourri (foxtrot)

External links
https://www.chandos.net/chanimages/Booklets/GL5176.pdf - CD inlay for re-release that includes a 1938 recording of Niagara

1888 births
1961 deaths